Clube Esportivo Passense de Futebol e Cultura, commonly known as Passense, is a Brazilian football club based in Passos, Minas Gerais state.

History
The club was founded on January 23, 2001, after political conflicts in the city of Passos, by former members of Clube Esportivo de Futebol. The club joined a partnership in 2007 with Passos City Hall and Clube Atlético Mineiro to compete in the Campeonato Mineiro Módulo II.

Stadium
Clube Esportivo Passense de Futebol e Cultura play their home games at Estádio Soares de Azevedo. The stadium has a maximum capacity of 12,000 people.

References

Association football clubs established in 2001
Football clubs in Minas Gerais
2001 establishments in Brazil